The Valea Șerpuița is a left tributary of the river Rusciori in Romania. It flows into the Rusciori in the city Sibiu.

References

Rivers of Romania
Rivers of Sibiu County